= Indian states ranking by household size =

This is a list of the States of India ranked in order of average number of persons per family. This information was compiled from NFHS-3. National Family health survey (NFHS) is a large-scale, multi round survey conducted by the International Institute for Population Sciences (IIPS), Mumbai, which is designated by the Ministry of Health and Family Welfare (MOHFW), Government of India. NFHS-3 was released on 11 Oct 2007, and the detailed survey can be viewed in the following website According to NFHS-3, the average household size of India is 4.8. The lowest is 3.5 in Tamil Nadu and the highest is 5.7 in Uttar Pradesh.

== List ==
Rank	State	Household size (persons)
1	Tamil Nadu	3.5
2	Andhra Pradesh	3.9
3	Goa	4.2
4	Kerala	4.3
5	Tripura	4.3
6	West Bengal	4.5
7	Odisha	4.5
8	Sikkim	4.5
9	Nagaland	4.5
10	Himachal Pradesh	4.6
11	Karnataka	4.6
12	Assam	4.7
13	Gujarat	4.7
14	Maharashtra	4.7
15	Arunachal Pradesh	4.8
16	Mizoram	4.8
17	India average	4.8
18	Chhattisgarh	^{N}/_{A}
19	Madhya Pradesh	5
20	Uttarakhand	5
21	Manipur	5
22	Meghalaya	5.1
23	Punjab	5.2
24	Rajasthan	5.5
25	Haryana	5.3
26	Bihar	5.4
27	Jharkhand	5.4
28	Jammu and Kashmir	5.7
29	Uttar Pradesh	5.7

== Indian households with number of members ==
Total/ Rural/ Urban	Normal Households		Household Size									
Total/ Rural/ Urban	Number	Population	1	2	3	4	5	6	7-10	11-14	15+	Mean Household Size
TOTAL	192,671,808	1,018,865,868	7,564,196	15,871,465	22,472,551	37,022,159	35,873,420	26,147,067	40,876,110	4,547,141	2,297,699	5
RURAL	137,235,518	737,283,492	5,447,972	11,488,543	15,158,542	24,539,403	25,201,835	19,218,618	31,005,414	3,447,071	1,728,120	5
URBAN	55,436,290	281,582,376	2,116,224	4,382,922	7,314,009	12,482,756	10,671,585	6,928,499	9,870,696	1,100,070	569,579	5
